Kordeyan (also Romanized as Kordeyān) is a village in Lavasan-e Kuchak Rural District, Lavasanat District, Shemiranat County, Tehran Province, Iran. At the 2006 census, its population was 56, in 13 families.

References 

Populated places in Shemiranat County